The men's 56 pound weight throw was a track and field athletics event held as part of the Athletics at the 1904 Summer Olympics programme. It was the first time the event was held. It would not appear on the Olympic program again until the 1920 Summer Olympics, which would be the last time the 56 pound (25.4 kg) weight was thrown in the Olympic Games. The competition was held on September 1, 1904. 6 athletes from 2 nations competed. The event was won by Étienne Desmarteau of Canada, one of only two gold medals (out of 25 events) in athletics won by an athlete not from the United States. Americans John Flanagan and James Mitchel took second and third, respectively.

Background

This was the first of two appearances of the event, which was held again only in 1920. The favorites were John Flanagan of the United States and Étienne Desmarteau of Canada (making this one of the few athletics events with serious international competition). Flanagan was best known as a hammer thrower, having won the event at the 1900 Summer Olympics and, three days before this competition, repeated that victory in St. Louis. (He would win again at the 1908 Summer Olympics.) Desmarteau had won the only head-to-head competition between the two men, however, at the 1902 AAU championship.

Competition format

The format of the competition is unclear. The throwing area was a seven-foot circle.

Records

These were the standing world and Olympic records (in metres) prior to the 1904 Summer Olympics.

* using unlimited run-and-follow

Étienne Desmarteau had the first legal mark of the competition (throwing second; Ralph Rose's first throw was a foul). That throw went 10.46 metres and was the winning mark and Olympic record at the end of the competition.

Schedule

Results

Sources

 

Athletics at the 1904 Summer Olympics
1920